Miss Europe 1954 was the 17th edition of the Miss Europe pageant and the sixth edition under the Mondial Events Organization. It was held in Vichy, France, on June 20, 1954. Christel Schaack of Germany, was originally crowned Miss Europe 1954, by outgoing titleholder Eloisa Cianni of Italy. However, it was later revealed that Schaack was a widow and thus she was disqualified from Miss Europe and stripped of her crown. The crown then went to the 1st runner-up Danièle Génault of France. Despite being a widow, Schaack was allowed to keep her national Miss Germany title as the requirements for Miss Germany at the time only stated that single unmarried women can participate with no ban on widows or women with annulled marriages. The jury for this years pageant, in response, gave her the title of "Honorary Miss Europe", even though Danièle Génault of France was awarded the official crown and title. The Mondial Events Organization/Miss Europe Organization continued to list Schaack as the official winner on their website until the site was shut down in 2006.

Results

Placements

Contestants 

 - Felicitas von Goebel
 - unknown
 - June Peters
 - Yvonne de Bruyn
 - Danièle Génault
 - Christel Schaack
 - Eva Brika
 - Conny Harteveld
 - Sheila Lee
 - Nadia Bianchi
 - Fernande Kodesch
 - Beate Brevik Johansen
 - Kasindria Klimezak (Kazimiera Klimczak)
 - Gunilla Johansson
 - unknown

Notes

Withdrawals
 - No pageant held.
 - Withdrew for unknown reasons.
 - Juanita Billa; was not allowed to compete due to not being an official Miss Spain titleholder. Billa was elected by tourists in Biarritz, France, in 1953.

Returns

References

External links 
 

Miss Europe
1954 beauty pageants
1954 in France